Aymeline Valade (born 17 October 1984) is a French supermodel and actress.

Early life
Born in Montpellier, Valade grew up in Lyon, Paris and Nice. Valade learned to read at the age of 11  and learned how to skate. Valade was first noticed by an agent at 15, while she was skating in Nice. However she decided not to try modeling and instead, studied journalism and communication.

At age 22, she decided to go to Paris and started her career as a model. Her first fashion show during fashion week, for Balenciaga, was her breakthrough in fashion.

Career
As a model, Valade has participated in more than 200 fashion shows, including Chanel, Chloé, Dolce & Gabbana, Emilio Pucci, Louis Vuitton, Marc Jacobs, Marni and Versace.

In 2014, Valade played Betty Catroux in Saint Laurent.

Filmography

References

External links

1984 births
French female models
21st-century French actresses
French expatriate actresses in the United States
Actors from Montpellier
Living people